
Year 83 BC was a year of the pre-Julian Roman calendar. At the time it was known as the Year of the Consulship of Asiaticus and Norbanus (or, less frequently, year 671 Ab urbe condita). The denomination 83 BC for this year has been used since the early medieval period, when the Anno Domini calendar era became the prevalent method in Europe for naming years.

Events 
 By place 

 Roman Republic 
 Spring – Lucius Cornelius Sulla returns to Italy from his campaigns in Greece and lands with his legions unopposed at Brundisium. He defeats the popular forces of Gaius Norbanus in the Battle of Mount Tifata.
 Lucius Licinius Murena, the Roman governor of Asia, clashes with the Pontic forces of Mithridates VI, starting the Second Mithridatic War.
 A fire breaks out which burns down the Temple of Jupiter (Jupiter Capitolinus) and destroys the collection of Sibylline Books.

Births 
 Fulvia, Roman matron and wife of Mark Antony (approximate date)
 Julia, daughter of Julius Caesar and Cornelia (approximate date) (d. 54 BC)
 Mark Antony, Roman politician and General (who later married Cleopatra) (approximate date) (d. 30 BC)

Deaths 
 Philip I Philadelphus, Seleucid king (approximate date)

References